This is a list of the Hemiptera (true bugs) recorded on the island of Ireland.

Suborder Heteroptera (typical bugs)

Infraorder Dipsocoromorpha

Family Ceratocombidae 

Ceratocombus coleoptratus (Zetterstedt, 1819)

Family Dipsocoridae  

Cryptostemma alienum Herrich-Schäffer 1835
Pachycoleus waltli Fieber 1860

Infraorder Gerromorpha (semiaquatic bugs)

Superfamily Gerroidea

Family Gerridae (water striders)

Aquarius najas  (De Geer 1773)
Gerris argentatus  Schummel 1832
Gerris costae  (Herrich-Schäffer 1850)
Gerris lacustris  (Linnaeus 1758)
Gerris odontogaster  (Zetterstedt 1828)
Gerris thoracicus  Schummel 1832
Gerris lateralis  Schummel 1832
Limnoporus rufoscutellatus  (Latreille 1807)

Family Veliidae (riffle bugs)

Microvelia reticulata   (Burmeister 1835)
Microvelia pygmaea   (Dufour 1833)
Velia caprai Tamanini 1947
Velia saulii Tamanini 1947

Superfamily Hebroidea

Family Hebridae (velvet water bugs)
Hebrus pusillus   (Fallen 1807) 
Hebrus ruficeps     Thomson, 1871

Superfamily Hydrometroidea

Family Hydrometridae  (marsh treaders, water measurers)  
thumb|Hydrometra stagnorum, a water measurer especially common in Ulster and coastal areas.
Hydrometra stagnorum   (Linnaeus 1758)
Hydrometra gracilenta   Horváth, 1899

Infraorder Leptopodomorpha

Family Saldidae (shore bugs)

Chartoscirta cincta  (Herrich-Schäffer 1841)
Chartoscirta elegantula   (Fallen 1807)
Chiloxanthus pilosus   (Fallen 1807)
Halosalda lateralis   (Fallen 1807)
Macrosaldula scotica   (Curtis 1835)
Saldula connemarae   Walton 1986
Saldula opacula   (Zetterstedt 1838)
Saldula orthochila   (Fieber 1859)
Saldula pallipes   (Fabricius 1794)
Saldula palustris   (Douglas 1874)
Saldula pilosella   (Thomson 1871)
Saldula saltatoria   (Linnaeus 1758)

Family Aepophilidae 

Aepophilus bonnairei Signoret 1879

Infraorder Nepomorpha (true water bugs)

Superfamily Corixoidea

Family Corixidae (water boatmen)

	
Arctocorisa carinata (C.R. Sahlberg 1819)
Arctocorisa germari (Fieber 1848)
Callicorixa praeusta (Fieber 1848)
Callicorixa wollastoni (Douglas & Scott, 1865)
Corixa affinis Leach 1817
Corixa dentipes Thomson 1869
Corixa iberica  Jansson 1981
Corixa panzeri  Fieber 1848
Corixa punctata  (Illiger 1807)
Cymatia bonsdorffii  (C.R. Sahlberg 1819)
Glaenocorisa cavifrons  (Thomson 1869)
Hesperocorixa castanea  (Thomson 1869)
Hesperocorixa linnaei (Fieber 1848)
Hesperocorixa moesta  (Fieber 1848)
Hesperocorixa sahlbergi  (Fieber 1848)
Micronecta griseola  Horvath 1899
Micronecta poweri  (Douglas & Scott 1869)
Paracorixa concinna  (Fieber 1848)
Sigara selecta  (Fieber 1848)
Sigara stagnalis  (Leach 1817)
Sigara nigrolineata  (Fieber 1848)
Sigara limitata  (Fieber 1848)
Sigara semistriata  (Fieber 1848)
Sigara venusta  (Douglas & Scott 1869)
Sigara dorsalis  (Leach 1817)
Sigara distincta  (Fieber 1848)
Sigara falleni  (Fieber 1848)
Sigara fallenoidea  (Hungerford 1926)
Sigara fossarum  (Leach 1817)
Sigara scotti  (Douglas & Scott 1868)
Sigara lateralis  (Leach 1817)

Superfamily Nepoidea

Family Nepidae (water scorpions, needle bugs)

Nepa cinerea Linnaeus 1758

Superfamily Aphelocheiroidea

Family Aphelocheiridae 
Aphelocheirus aestivalis  (Fabricius 1794)

Superfamily Notonectoidea

Family Notonectidae (backswimmers)

Notonecta glauca  Linnaeus, 1758
Notonecta obliqua  Thunberg, 1787
Notonecta viridis  Delcourt, 1909
Notonecta maculata  Fabricius, 1794

Superfamily Pleoidea

Family Pleidae 
Plea minutissima Leach 1817

Infraorder Cimicomorpha (Assassin bugs, bed bugs, etc.)

Superfamily Cimicoidea

Family Anthocoridae (minute pirate bugs or flower bugs) 

Acompocoris alpinus Reuter, 1875
Acompocoris pygmaeus (Fallen 1807)
Anthocoris butleri Le Quesne, 1954
Anthocoris confusus Reuter 1884
Anthocoris gallarumulmi (De Geer 1773)
Anthocoris limbatus Fieber 1836
Anthocoris nemoralis (Fabricius 1794)
Anthocoris nemorum (Linnaeus 1761)
Anthocoris sarothamni Douglas & Scott 1865
Dufouriellus ater (Dufour 1833)
Lyctocoris campestris (Fabricius 1794)
Orius laticollis  (Reuter 1884)
Orius majusculus (Reuter 1879)
Orius laevigatus (Fieber 1860)
Orius niger (Wolff 1811)
Temnostethus gracilis Horvath 1907
Temnostethus pusillus (Herrich-Schäffer 1835)
Temnostethus tibialis Reuter 1888
Tetraphleps bicuspis  (Herrich-Schäffer 1835)

Family Microphysidae 
Loricula elegantula  (Baerensprung 1858)
Loricula exilis  (Fallen 1807)
Loricula inconspicua  (Douglas & Scott 1871)

Family Cimicidae (bed bugs, bat bugs) 

Cimex lectularius Linnaeus 1758
Cimex pipistrelli Jenyns 1839
Oeciacus hirundinis (Lamarck 1816)

Family Miridae (plant bugs, leaf bugs, grass bugs) 

Adelphocoris lineolatus (Goeze 1778)
Adelphocoris seticornis  (Fabricius 1775)
Apolygus lucorum  (Meyer-Dür 1843)
Apolygus spinolae  (Meyer-Dür 1841)
Asciodema obsoleta  (Fieber 1864)
Atractotomus magnicornis  (Fallen 1807)
Blepharidopterus angulatus  (Fallen 1807)
Bothynotus pilosus  (Boheman 1852)
Bryocoris pteridis  (Fallen 1807)
Calocoris roseomaculatus  (De Geer 1773)
Camptozygum aequale  (Villers 1789)
Campyloneura virgula  (Herrich-Schäffer 1835)
Capsodes flavomarginatus  (Donovan 1798)
Capsus ater  (Linnaeus 1758)
Charagochilus gyllenhalii   (Fallen 1807)
Chlamydatus pullus  (Reuter 1870)
Closterotomus norwegicus  (Gmelin 1790)
Compsidolon salicellum   (Herrich-Schäffer 1841)
Conostethus brevis Reuter 1877
Conostethus griseus Douglas & Scott 1870
Cyllecoris histrionius   (Linnaeus 1767)
Cyrtorhinus caricis   (Fallen 1807)
Deraeocoris ruber   (Linnaeus 1758)
Deraeocoris scutellaris   (Fabricius 1794)
Dichrooscytus rufipennis   (Fallen 1807)
Dicyphus constrictus   (Boheman 1852)
Dicyphus epilobii Reuter 1883
Dicyphus errans   (Wolff 1804)
Dicyphus stachydis J. Sahlberg 1878
Dicyphus pallicornis   (Fieber 1861)
Dryophilocoris flavoquadrimaculatus (De Geer 1773)
Fieberocapsus flaveolus   (Reuter 1870)
Globiceps flavomaculatus   (Fabricius 1794)
Globiceps fulvicollis Jakovlev 1877
Grypocoris stysi   (Wagner 1968)
Hallodapus rufescens   (Burmeister 1835)
Harpocera thoracica   (Fallen 1807)
Heterocordylus tibialis   (Hahn 1833)
Heterotoma planicornis   (Pallas 1772)
Leptopterna dolabrata   (Linnaeus 1758)
Leptopterna ferrugata   (Fallen 1807)
Liocoris tripustulatus   (Fabricius 1781)
Lygocoris pabulinus   (Linnaeus 1761)
Lygocoris rugicollis   (Fallen 1807)
Lygus maritimus Wagner 1949
Lygus rugulipennis Poppius 1911
Lygus wagneri Remane 1955
Macrolophus pygmaeus   (Rambur 1839)
Macrotylus paykullii   (Fallen 1807)
Malacocoris chlorizans   (Panzer 1794)
Mecomma dispar   (Boheman 1852)
Mecomma ambulans   (Fallen 1807)
Megalocoleus molliculus   (Fallen 1807)
Miris striatus   (Linnaeus 1758)
Monalocoris filicis   (Linnaeus 1758)
Neolygus contaminatus   (Fallen 1807)
Neolygus viridis   (Fallen 1807)
Notostira erratica   (Linnaeus 1758)
Orthocephalus coriaceus   (Fabricius 1777)
Orthocephalus saltator   (Hahn 1835)
Orthonotus rufifrons   (Fallen 1807)
Orthops basalis   (A. Costa 1853)
Orthops campestris   (Linnaeus 1758)
Orthops kalmii   (Linnaeus 1758)
Orthotylus ericetorum   (Fallen 1807)
Orthotylus flavosparsus   (C.R. Sahlberg 1841)
Orthotylus flavinervis   (Kirschbaum 1856)
Orthotylus marginalis Reuter 1883
Orthotylus nassatus   (Fabricius 1787)
Orthotylus ochrotrichus Fieber 1864
Orthotylus prasinus   (Fallen 1826)
Orthotylus tenellus   (Fallen 1807)
Orthotylus viridinervis   (Kirschbaum 1856)
Orthotylus adenocarpi   (Perris 1857)
Orthotylus concolor   (Kirschbaum 1856)
Orthotylus virescens   (Douglas & Scott 1865)
Orthotylus bilineatus   (Fallen 1807)
Pachytomella parallela   (Meyer-Dür 1843)
Pantilius tunicatus   (Fabricius 1781)
Phylus coryli   (Linnaeus 1758)
Phylus melanocephalus   (Linnaeus 1767)
Phytocoris ulmi   (Linnaeus 1758)
Phytocoris varipes Boheman 1852
Phytocoris dimidiatus  Kirschbaum 1856
Phytocoris longipennis Flor 1861
Phytocoris populi   (Linnaeus 1758)
Phytocoris reuteri Saunders 1876
Phytocoris tiliae   (Fabricius 1777)
Pinalitus atomarius   (Meyer-Dür 1843)
Pinalitus cervinus   (Herrich-Schäffer 1841)
Pinalitus rubricatus   (Fallen 1807)
Pithanus maerkelii   (Herrich-Schäffer 1838)
Plagiognathus arbustorum   (Fabricius 1794)
Plagiognathus chrysanthemi   (Wolff 1804)
Platycranus bicolor Douglas & Scott 1868
Plesiodema pinetella   (Zetterstedt 1828)
Polymerus palustris   (Reuter 1907)
Polymerus nigrita   (Fallen 1807)
Psallodema fieberi   (Fieber 1864)
Psallus betuleti   (Fallen 1826)
Psallus perrisi   (Mulsant & Rey 1852)
Psallus variabilis   (Fallen 1807)
Psallus wagneri Ossiannilsson 1953
Psallus ambiguus   (Fallen 1807)
Psallus quercus   (Kirschbaum 1856)
Psallus confusus Rieger 1981
Psallus falleni Reuter 1883
Psallus flavellus Stichel 1933
Psallus haematodes   (Gmelin 1790)
Psallus lepidus Fieber 1858
Psallus mollis   (Mulsant & Rey 1852)
Psallus salicis   (Kirschbaum 1856)
Psallus varians   (Herrich-Schäffer 1841)
Rhabdomiris striatellus   (Fabricius 1794)
Stenodema calcarata   (Fallen 1807)
Stenodema holsata   (Fabricius 1787)
Stenodema laevigatum (Linnaeus 1758)
Stenotus binotatus   (Fabricius 1794)
Teratocoris saundersi Douglas & Scott 1869
Teratocoris viridis Douglas & Scott 1867
Trigonotylus ruficornis   (Geoffroy 1785)
Tytthus pubescens   (Knight 1931)
Tytthus pygmaeus   (Zetterstedt 1838)

Family Nabidae (damsel bugs)

Himacerus major (A. Costa 1842)
Himacerus mirmicoides  (O. Costa 1834)
Himacerus boops  (Schiødte 1870)
Nabis limbatus  Dahlbom 1851
Nabis lineatus   Dahlbom 1851
Nabis flavomarginatus  Scholtz 1847
Nabis ericetorum  Scholtz 1847
Nabis ferus (Linnaeus 1758)
Nabis rugosus   (Linnaeus 1758)

Family Reduviidae (assassin bugs) 
Empicoris culiciformis (De Geer 1773)
Empicoris vagabundus (Linnaeus 1758)

Family Tingidae (lace bugs)

Acalypta brunnea   (Germar 1837)
Acalypta carinata   (Panzer 1806)
Acalypta parvula   (Fallen 1807)
Derephysia foliacea   (Fallen 1807)
Dictyla convergens   (Herrich-Schäffer 1835)
Kalama tricornis   (Schrank 1801)
Tingis cardui   (Linnaeus 1758)

Infraorder Pentatomomorpha

Superfamily Aradoidea

Family Aradidae (flat bugs) 
Aradus depressus (Fabricius 1794)

Superfamily Pentatomoidea (shield bugs and relatives)

Family Acanthosomatidae (shield bugs)
Acanthosoma haemorrhoidale (Linnaeus 1758)
Elasmostethus interstinctus  (Linnaeus 1758)
Elasmucha grisea  (Linnaeus 1758)
Cyphostethus tristriatus  (Fabricius, 1787)

Family Cydnidae (burrowing shield bugs) 
Sehirus luctuosus Mulsant & Rey 1866
Thyreocoris scarabaeoides   (Linnaeus 1758)

Family Scutelleridae (jewel bugs or metallic shield bugs) 
Eurygaster maura   (Linnaeus 1758)
Eurygaster testudinaria   (Geoffroy 1785)

Family Pentatomidae (stink bugs) 
Dolycoris baccarum  (Linnaeus 1758)
Palomena prasina  (Linnaeus 1761)
Pentatoma rufipes(Linnaeus, 1758)
Picromerus bidens  (Linnaeus 1758)
Piezodorus lituratus  (Fabricius 1794)
Rhacognathus punctatus  (Linnaeus 1758)
Troilus luridus  (Fabricius 1775)
Zicrona caerulea  (Linnaeus 1758)

Superfamily Coreoidea

Family Alydidae (broad-headed bugs) 
Alydus calcaratus (Linnaeus, 1758)

Family Coreidae  (leaf-footed bugs) 
Coreus marginatus (Linnaeus 1758)

Family Rhopalidae (scentless plant bugs) 
Corizus hyoscyami  (Linnaeus 1758)
Liorhyssus hyalinus  (Fabricius 1794)

Family Stenocephalidae 
Dicranocephalus agilis   (Scopoli 1763)

Superfamily Lygaeoidea

Family Berytidae  (stilt bugs) 

Berytinus minor  (Herrich-Schäffer 1835)
Berytinus montivagus  (Meyer-Dür 1841)
Berytinus signoreti  (Fieber 1859)
Gampsocoris punctipes  (Germar 1822)
Metatropis rufescens (Herrich-Schäffer 1835)
Neides tipularius  (Linnaeus 1758)

Family Lygaeidae (milkweed bugs, true seed bugs) 

Acompus rufipes (Wolff 1804)
Chilacis typhae (Perris 1857)
Cymus claviculus (Fallen 1807)
Cymus glandicolor Hahn 1832
Drymus pilicornis (Mulsant & Rey 1852)
Drymus brunneus (R.F. Sahlberg 1848)
Drymus ryeii Douglas & Scott 1865
Drymus sylvaticus (Fabricius 1775)
Gastrodes grossipes (De Geer 1773)
Heterogaster urticae (Fabricius 1775)
Ischnocoris angustulus (Boheman 1852)
Ischnodemus sabuleti (Fallen 1826)
Kleidocerys resedae (Panzer 1797)
Lamproplax picea (Flor 1860)
Lasiosomus enervis (Herrich-Schäffer 1835)
Macrodema microptera (Curtis 1836)
Megalonotus chiragra (Fabricius 1794)
Megalonotus dilatatus (Herrich-Schäffer 1840)
Nysius thymi  (Wolff 1804)
Pachybrachius fracticollis (Schilling 1829)
Peritrechus geniculatus (Hahn 1832)
Peritrechus lundii (Gmelin 1790)
Plinthisus brevipennis (Latreille 1807)
Scolopostethus affinis (Schilling 1829)
Scolopostethus decoratus (Hahn 1833)
Scolopostethus grandis Horvath 1880
Scolopostethus puberulus Horvath 1887
Scolopostethus thomsoni Reuter 1875
Stygnocoris fuligineus (Geoffroy 1785)
Stygnocoris rusticus (Fallen 1807)
Stygnocoris sabulosus (Schilling 1829)
Taphropeltus contractus (Herrich-Schäffer 1835)
Trapezonotus arenarius (Linnaeus 1758)

Family Piesmatidae (ash-grey leaf bugs)
Parapiesma quadratum (Fieber 1844)
Piesma maculatum (Laporte 1833)

References

O’Connor. J.P. and Nelson, B., 2012, An Annotated Checklist of the Irish Hemiptera and Small Orders.The Irish Biogeographical Society and the National Museum of Ireland, Dublin
Berend Aukema and Christian Rieger (Editors) Catalogue of the Heteroptera of the Palaearctic Region (5-Volumes and supplement) Amsterdam : The Netherlands Entomological Society(Nederlandse Entomologische Vereniging)  1995-2006

Further reading
Edward Saunders, 1892 The Hemiptera Heteroptera of the British Islands : a descriptive account of the families, genera, and species indigenous to Great Britain and Ireland : with notes as to localities, habitats, etc. London :L. Reeve & Co. online includes coloured plates
T. R. E. Southwood & Dennis Leston, 1959 Land & Water Bugs of the British Isles Frederick Warne & Co.

External links
British Isles Bugs
Shieldbugs of Ireland
DEpository

Taxonomy and images
Consortium for the Barcode of Life Hemiptera images of most Irish species via taxonomy or search 
Encyclopedia of Life online has many images via search
 Danmarks Blomstertæger
AMNH Plant Bugs Inventory Synonymy
Biolib

Identification
Faune de France Insectes  Insectes Hémiptères pdfs free downloads
Royal Entomological Society Handbooks Out of print parts available as free pdfs  are:
Vol 2 Part 2a. Hemiptera - Cicadomorpha (excluding Deltocephalinae and Typhlocybinae). Walter J. Le Quesne
Vol 2 Part 2b. Hemiptera - Cicadomorpha - Deltocephalinae. Walter J. Le Quesne
Vol 2 Part 2c. Cicadellidae (Typhlocybinae) with a checklist of the British Auchenorhyncha (Hemiptera, Homoptera) W. J. Le Quesne and K. R. Payne
Vol 2 Part 3. Hemiptera - Fulgoromorpha. Walter J. Le Quesne
Vol 2 Part 4a. Homoptera - Aphidoidea (Part) - Chaitophoridae & Callaphididae. H. L. G. Stroyan
Vol 2 Part 5a. Homoptera - Psylloidea. I. D. Hodkinson & I. M. White

Economic 
Pestinfo Wiki

Ireland, hemiptera
hemip